Island Hospital, founded in 1996, is a 600-bed hospital located in Penang, Malaysia. The hospital is recognised as one of the leading healthcare providers in Malaysia, serving patients from around the region. Island Hospital offers a wide range of healthcare services and is committed to providing best-in-class care to deliver care in the best interest of the patient and "to comfort always."
Island Hospital has over 70 full-time specialists across 9 Centres of Excellence, offering a wide range of treatment services that are supported by cutting-edge medical equipment and technology. The hospital's specialists are highly experienced and renowned in their dedicated fields, with at least 25 years of practice and international exposure in their medical careers.
Its commitment to providing excellent patient care has earned it recognition as one of the best hospitals in its class. As part of its ongoing efforts to improve the quality of care it provides, Island Hospital has expanded its services to aim towards becoming a Regional Quaternary Care hospital. This expansion has allowed it to offer patients an advanced level of specialised and niche treatments. 
As a testament to its dedication to providing high-quality healthcare services, Island Hospital was shortlisted by the Malaysia Healthcare Travel Council (MHTC) as the only hospital in Penang in the Flagship Medical Tourism Hospital Programme.
The Flagship Medical Tourism Hospital Programme is an innovative initiative that aims to establish new standards in global healthcare travel, spearheaded by the Malaysia Healthcare Travel Council (MHTC) in 2022. Fully endorsed by the Government of Malaysia and the Ministry of Health, this collaborative effort with international bodies IQVIA and Joint Commission International (JCI) aims to position Malaysia as a globally renowned icon for healthcare travel, delivering exceptional end-to-end patient experiences anchored on medical and service excellence best practices and international branding. The programme is a critical component of the five-year Malaysia Healthcare Travel Industry blueprint, which seeks to provide the Best Malaysia Healthcare Travel Experience by 2025.

History 
Island Hospital was founded in 1996, with the construction of the hospital eventually taking a mere 10 months.

In 2017, the Penang state government announced plans to build an extension to the existing facility, named Island Medical City, at Peel Avenue. Upon completion, the project is expected to expand the hospital's capacity to 1000 beds. Planned facilities also include a healthcare traveller hotel and medical suites.

After 5 years, Island Hospital’s new wing which is Peel Wing opened its doors for operations in 2022. With 14 Operating Theatres and an expanded capacity of another 300 beds, the hospital is now the first 600-bed private hospital in Penang, equipped with the latest infrastructure and talented healthcare professionals to provide a range of medical and surgical services to its patients.  

Currently the top medical tourism hospital in Malaysia, Island Hospital has clinched several awards over the years and in 2022, has been given a full 4-year accreditation from the Australian Council on Healthcare Standards (ACHS), in recognition of its commitment to deliver the highest quality in healthcare to its patients, based on the international standards of assessment.

Awards received to date include, Top Medical Tourism Hospital by MHTC (2012), The Star Outstanding Business Awards (SOBA)’s Best in Marketing Gold Award (2016), Medical Tourism Hospital of the Year by Frost & Sullivan (2017), Asia’s Best Performing Companies in the Asia Corporate Excellence & Sustainability Awards (ACES) of the Year (2018), The Star Export Excellence Awards (Services Category for large companies)(2019), Global Brand Award Malaysia Power Brand – Quality Excellence Award in Healthcare  (2018/2019. Value Based Hospital of the Year in Asia Pacific by the Global Health Asia Pacific Awards (2020), Hospital of the Year in Malaysia and Diagnostics Provider of the Year in Malaysia, awarded by Healthcare Asia Awards (2020), Hospital COVID-19 Healthcare Service Provider of the Year, Health Screening Provider of the Year, Sports Rehab and Physiotherapy Service of the Year in Asia Pacific by the Global Health Asia Pacific Awards (2021), Medical Tourism Initiative of the Year in Malaysia awarded by Healthcare Asia Awards (2022), Medical Tourism Hospital of the Year in Asia Pacific, Sports Rehab and Physiotherapy Service of the Year in Asia Pacific, Most Resilient Hospital of the Year, Healthcare Technology Innovation Leadership Award, Diabetes Service Provider of the Year in Asia Pacific by the Global Health Asia Pacific Awards (2022).

Services 
Specialties in Island Hospital:
 Anesthesiology and Critical Care
 Cardiology
 Clinical Genetics
 Clinical Oncology and Haemato-Oncology

 Clinical Psychology
 Dental
 Dermatology
 Ear, Nose and Throat Surgery
 Endocrinology
 Gastroenterology
 General Surgery
 Infectious Diseases
 Internal Medicine
 Medical Microbiology
 Nephrology 
 Neurology and Neurosurgery
 Nuclear Medicine
 Obstetrics and Gynaecology
 Ophthalmology
 Orthopaedics Surgery
 Paediatrics
 Paediatrics- Dermatology
 Paediatrics- Respiratory Medicine
 Pathology
 Plastic Surgery
 Psychiatry
 Radiology
 Radiotherapy
 Rehabilitation and Physiotherapy
 Respiratory Medicine
 Rheumatology
 Speech Therapy
 Urology

Centres of Excellence 
Island Hospital has 9 Centres of Excellence that offer a wide range of services, supported by cutting-edge medical equipment and technology.

 Diabetes Centre
 Digestive Centre
 Fertility Centre
 Health Screening Centre
 Heart Centre
 Movement Disorder Clinic
 Spine Centre
 Rehabilitation and Physiotherapy
 Urology Centre

See also 
 List of hospitals in Malaysia

References 

Buildings and structures in George Town, Penang
Hospitals in Penang
Hospitals established in 1996